Jigme Lingpa (1730–1798) was a Tibetan tertön of the Nyingma lineage of Tibetan Buddhism. He was the promulgator of the Longchen Nyingthig, the Heart Essence teachings of Longchenpa, from whom, according to tradition, he received a vision in which the teachings were revealed. The Longchen Nyingthik eventually became the most famous and widely practiced cycle of Dzogchen teachings.

Career
Jigme Lingpa's childhood monastery was the Nyingma school's Palri monastery, or Pelri Tekchen Ling, in Chonggye, established by Sherab Ozer.
 
Prefiguring Jamgon Kongtrul's creation of the Five Collections, Jigme Lingpa gathered Nyingma texts that had become rare, starting with Nyingma tantras held in the manuscript collection of the Mindrolling Monastery. This collection of the Nyingma tantras led to the amassing of the Nyingma Gyübum ("Collection of Nyingma Tantras") for which Getse Mahapandita wrote the catalogue, proofread and arranged for its printing by soliciting the expensive and labour-intensive project of carving the woodblocks for the woodblock printing. The wood block carving was forded through the patronage of the royal family of Derge of Kham, who favoured and honoured Jigme Lingpa. Getse Mahapandita also arranged for the printing of texts by Jigme Lingpa and Longchenpa. Getse Mahapandita proofread the works of Jigme Lingpa, Longchenpa and the Nyingma Gyübum.

Jigme also wrote a nine-volume history of the Nyingma school of Tibetan Buddhism and other works. His non-sectarian presentation of the Madhyamaka (Middle Way view) follows Je Tsongkhapa's system.

A major precursor of the Rimé movement, Jigme Lingpa had many distinguished disciples in all four lineages. The first Dodrupchen Rinpoche, Dodrupchen Jigme Trinle Ozer, became his main lineage-holder. Among those held by tradition to be Jigme Lingpa's  reincarnations are Ye shes rdo rje, the Mdo mkhyen brtse ye shes rdo rje (1800–66, his mind-emanation), Patrul Rinpoche (speech-emanation) and Jamyang Khyentse Wangpo (body-emanation). In Bhutan his tradition is held by successive incarnation of the Padtselling tulku and Jikmé Kündröl Namgyel. Both Druptop Namgyel Lhündrup, 1st Padtselling Tulku  (1718-1786) and Jigmé Tenpé Gyeltshen, 2nd Padtselling Tulku (1788-1850) were students of Jigme Lingpa.

Jigme Lingpa, translated by Sam van Schaik, states how his learnings commenced: 

Janet Gyatso states that:

Terma
When explaining the transmission and reception of the 'treasures' (Tibetan: terma) of 'The Words of the Omniscient One' and 'The White Lotus' Jigme Lingpa makes reference to an admixture of 'mindstream', 'Absolute [Truth]' and 'adhishthana' and van Schaik (2004: p. 45) has rendered the Tibetan in English as follows : "the blessing of the truth-continuum", "the blessing of the continuum", and "the transmission-blessing of symbols and words" .

Longchen Nyingthig
Jigme Lingpa was a reincarnation of two important masters, Vimalamitra and King Trisong Deutsen. As the embodiment of these two figures, Tibet's two primary Dzogchen lineages were combined in him—the Vima Nyingtik and Khandro Nyingtik, both of which are contained in the Nyingtik Yapshi. Hence, the Longchen Nyingthig terma cycle is considered a condensation of these profound teachings.

The texts that were revealed by Jigme Lingpa, in their present-day form, comprise three volumes known as the Nyingtik Tsapö. The numerous treatises, sadhanas and prayers it contains deal primarily with tantric practice, in particular the generation stage and Dzogchen.

Jikmé Lingpa discovered the Longchen Nyingtik teachings as mind terma at the age of twenty-eight. Tulku Thondup writes:

In this vision, the wisdom dakinis gave Jikmé Lingpa a casket containing five yellow scrolls and seven crystal beads. One of the scrolls contained the prophetic guide of Longchen Nyingtik, called Nechang Thukkyi Drombu. At the instruction of a dakini, he ate the yellow scrolls and crystal beads, and all the words and meaning of the Longchen Nyingtik terma were awakened in his mind.

Jikmé Lingpa kept this terma secret for years, and he did not even transcribe the terma until he entered another retreat in which he had a series of visions of Longchen Rabjam. Tulku Thondup explains:

In the earth-hare year (1759) he started another three-year retreat at Chimpu. During that retreat, because he was inspired by three successive pure visions of Longchen Rabjam, and he was urged by repeated requests of dakinis, he transcribed his terma as the cycle of Longchen Nyingtik. On the tenth day of the sixth month (monkey month) of the monkey year (1764) he made his terma public for the first time by conferring the transmission of empowerment and the instructions upon fifteen disciples.

Sadhanas

Chöd
The Loud Laugh of the Dakini is a Chöd sādhanā from the Longchen Nyingtik.

Autobiography
Jigme Lingpa is also known for his autobiographical works, primarily his outer autobiographies found in his nine-volume "Collected Works" alongside his "Heart Sphere" cycle and other historical works. Most notably, his autobiographical works showed the dynamics of relationships between Tibetan Buddhist visionaries and lay political figures.

Works in translation

References

Citations

Works cited

Further reading

External links

Lotsawa House  - Featuring translations of several texts by Jigme Lingpa.

 

1729 births
1798 deaths
18th-century Buddhists
18th-century Tibetan people
Dzogchen lamas
Dzogchen lineages
Nyingma lamas
Qing dynasty Tibetan Buddhists
Tertöns
Tibetan Buddhists from Tibet
Tibetan Buddhism writers